San Francisco Tetlanohcan is a town in the Mexican state of Tlaxcala, at the foot of the La Malinche dormant volcano. San Francisco Tetlanohcan  has a population of 10,000 inhabitants, and is located about 20 minutes east of the state capital, Tlaxcala, Tlaxcala.

See also 
La Malinche
Tlaxcala

Populated places in Tlaxcala